The 2013 European Weightlifting Championships were held in Tirana, Albania from 8 April to 14 April 2013.

Schedule
The competition days were split in A and B groups.

Medal overview

Men

Women

Medals tables 
Ranking by all medals: "Big" (Total result) and "Small" (Snatch and Clean&Jerk)

Ranking by "Big" (Total result) medals

Participating countries
List of participating countries. In total 35 countries participated in this championships.

External links
Official website
Results
IWRP - database

European Weightlifting Championships
International weightlifting competitions hosted by Albania
2013 in Albanian sport
Sports competitions in Tirana
2013 in weightlifting
Weightlifting in Albania